Thomas O'Herlahy (O'Herlihy, O'Hiarlaithe) (died 1579) was the Catholic Bishop of Ross, Ireland (Rosscarbery).

Consecrated about 1560, he was one of three Irish bishops attending the Council of Trent. He tried to enforce its decrees, but fled with his chaplain to a small island. There he was betrayed to John Perrot, President of Munster, who sent him in chains to the Tower of London.

Simultaneously with Primate Creagh, he was confined until released after about three years and seven months on the security of Cormac MacCarthy, Lord of Muskery. He intended to retire to Flanders, but ill health contracted in prison induced him to return to Ireland. He was apprehended at Dublin, but released on exhibiting his discharge, and proceeded to Muskery under MacCarthy's protection.

Disliking the lavishness of that nobleman's house, he withdrew to a small farm and lived austerely. He made a visitation of his diocese yearly, and on great festivals officiated and preached in a neighbouring church. Thus, though afflicted with dropsy, he lived until his sixtieth (or seventieth) year. He was buried in Kilcrea Friary, County Cork.

References

Sources
Rothe, Analecta Nova et Mira, ed. Moran (Dublin, 1884);
Moran, Spicilegium Ossor., I (Dublin, 1874);
O'Reilly, Memorials of those who suffered for the Catholic Faith (London, 1868).

External links
Catholic Encyclopedia article

1579 deaths
Bishops of Cork or Cloyne or of Ross
Participants in the Council of Trent
Year of birth unknown
People from County Cork
16th-century Roman Catholic bishops in Ireland
People of Elizabethan Ireland
Post-Reformation Roman Catholic bishops in Ireland